Symbiosis is an album by jazz pianist Bill Evans with an orchestra arranged and conducted by Claus Ogerman recorded in 1974 and released on the MPS label. It was the third orchestral album by Evans and Ogerman following Plays the Theme from The V.I.P.s and Other Great Songs and Bill Evans Trio with Symphony Orchestra (1965). Portions of the 2nd Movement were used on the soundtrack of the 2004 film Sideways and in the 2021 film Judas and the Black Messiah.

Reception
The Allmusic review awarded the album 3 stars.

Track listing
All compositions by Claus Ogerman
 "Symbiosis 1st Movement (Moderato, Various Tempi) - 24:58
 "Symbiosis 2nd Movement (Largo - Andante - Maestoso - Largo) - 15:55
Recorded in New York City on February 11, 12 & 14, 1974.

Personnel
Bill Evans - piano, electric piano, Fender Rhodes
Eddie Gómez - bass
Marty Morell - drums
Claus Ogerman - arranger, conductor
Mel Davis, Johnny Frosk, Bernie Glow, Marky Markowitz, Victor Paz, Marvin Stamm - trumpet
Paul Faulise, Urbie Green, Tom Mitchell - trombone
Ray Alonge, Jim Buffington, Earl Chapin, Peter Gordon, Al Richmond, Gruce Tilotson - French horn
Don Butterfield - tuba
Don Hammond, Hubert Laws, Bill Stapin - flute
Phil Bodner, George Marge - oboe
Wally Kane, Don McCourt - bassoon
Danny Bank, Ron Janelly - clarinet
Jerry Dodgion, Harvey Estrin, Walt Levinsky, Phil Woods - saxophones
Doug Allan, Dave Carey, George Devens, Ralph MacDonald - percussion
David Nadien - concertmaster

References

1974 albums
MPS Records albums
Bill Evans albums
Albums arranged by Claus Ogerman